The Men's 25 km competition at the 2017 World Championships was held on 21 July 2017.

Results
The race was started at 08:30.

References

Men's 25 km